The Penghu County Council is the elected county council of Penghu County, Republic of China. The council composes of 19 councilors lastly elected through the 2022 Republic of China local election on 26 November 2022.

See also
 Penghu County Government

References

External links
  

County councils of Taiwan
Penghu County